Battle of Carrickfergus may refer to:

 Battle of Carrickfergus (1597) during Tyrone's Rebellion
 Battle of Carrickfergus (1760) during the Seven Years' War